Monochilus is a genus of plants in the mint family, Lamiaceae, first described in 1835. It contains two known species, both endemic to Brazil.

Species
 Monochilus gloxinifolius Fisch. & C.A.Mey. - Rio de Janeiro
 Monochilus obovatus P.D.Cantino - Goiás

References

External links

Lamiaceae
Endemic flora of Brazil
Lamiaceae genera